"Big Mama's Funeral" is a long short story by Gabriel García Márquez that satirizes Latin American life and culture. It displays the exaggeration associated with magic realism. Most of the place names mentioned come from Colombia, and "Big Mama" herself is an exaggeration of the 'cacique' (political boss), a familiar figure in Latin American history and tradition.

Big Mama's funeral is mentioned in García Márquez's famous novel One Hundred Years of Solitude soon after Melquiades' death, an example of the author's tendency to tie together his literary works.

Publication history 
Big Mama's Funeral was first published in 1962 in a collection of short stories also entitled Los funerales de la Mamá Grande.

References 

1962 short stories
Short stories by Gabriel García Márquez